Georges Ditzler (born 15 November 1897, date of death unknown) was a Belgian footballer. He played in three matches for the Belgium national football team in 1926.

References

External links

1897 births
Year of death missing
Belgian footballers
Belgium international footballers
Place of birth missing
Association football defenders
Standard Liège players